Nana-Mambéré is one of the 16 prefectures of the Central African Republic. It covers an area of 26,600 km and has a population of 233,666 (2003 census). The capital is Bouar. It was part of Kamerun when it was a German colony between 1884 and 1916.

Other locations in Nana-Mambéré are Abba, Baboua, Gallo and Yanoye. Bouar, principal city of Nana-Mambéré, is also the headquarters of the Evangelical Lutheran Church for the Central African Republic. The church's seminary and biblical school are located in Baboua.

References

 
Prefectures of the Central African Republic